Broadway Across Canada is a Toronto, Ontario-based theatrical presenter which presents touring Broadway shows, family productions and other live theatrical events across Canada.

Broadway Across Canada was formed by the amalgamation of the historic touring Canada business headed by Ronald Andrew with Garth Drabinsky's Livent operations. Livent was acquired by SFX Entertainment in 1999.  SFX was later sold to Clear Channel Communications which renamed the division Broadway Across Canada in 2005. Clear Channel subsequently spun off its live theater operations as Live Nation. The company, along with its parent Broadway Across America, was acquired from Live Nation in January 2008 by Key Brand Entertainment (now the John Gore Organization, owned by UK-based producer John Gore. In 2008, Broadway Across America and Broadway Across Canada sold over 6.4 million tickets throughout its 40 theatres in the United States and Canada.

Venues
As of October 2016, Broadway Across Canada presents shows at the following venues:

 Calgary, Alberta: Southern Alberta Jubilee Auditorium
 Edmonton, Alberta: Northern Alberta Jubilee Auditorium
 Kitchener, Ontario: Centre In The Square
 Montreal, Quebec: Place des Arts and Théâtre Saint-Denis
 Ottawa, Ontario: National Arts Centre
 Quebec City, Quebec: Grand Théâtre de Québec
 Regina, Saskatchewan: Conexus Arts Centre
 Saskatoon, Saskatchewan: TCU Place
 Vancouver, British Columbia: Queen Elizabeth Theatre
 Winnipeg, Manitoba: Centennial Concert Hall

References

External links
 Broadway Across Canada official website

Theatrical organizations in Canada